National Tertiary Route 416, or just Route 416 (or ) is a National Road Route of Costa Rica, located in the Cartago province.

Description
In Cartago province the route covers Paraíso canton (Paraíso district).

References

Highways in Costa Rica